The Liberty Flames football  program represents Liberty University, a private Christian university located in Lynchburg, Virginia, in college football. The Flames compete in NCAA Division I Football Bowl Subdivision (FBS) as an independent. The program, which previously competed in Football Championship Subdivision (FCS), announced it would start a transition to the top level of NCAA football in July 2017. The Flames became a provisional FBS member in 2018, and became a full FBS member with bowl eligibility in 2019. In 2020, Liberty entered the rankings in the AP Poll at 25 for the first time in program history. 

In 2021, Liberty University announced the Flames would become full members of Conference USA effective for the 2023 football season.

History

Danny Rocco era (2006–2011)
In 2007, the Flames captured their first Big South Conference Football championship with a 31–0 victory over Gardner-Webb. The Flames capped off their second year under head coach Danny Rocco with an 8–3 record and an unblemished 4–0 Big South record to claim the title.

Liberty ran its unbeaten Big South streak to 11-straight games, finishing back-to-back conference championship seasons with a 30–10 victory over Gardner-Webb. The Flames finished with a 10–2 record on the year and finished the conference slate unbeaten at 5–0. The Flames to become the first team in Big South history to win five conference games in a season and joined Gardner-Webb as the only two teams to post consecutive unbeaten seasons. Liberty finished ranked 15th in the FCS Coaches Poll and 14th in the Sports Network Poll.

Undefeated in Big South play for 2009, the Flames just needed to capture a win over Stony Brook in the season finale to secure a 3rd straight Big South Conference Championship. Stony Brook who had only lost one game in Big South play (a 30–27 overtime loss to Charleston Southern the previous week) for 2009 could claim half of the Big South Championship with a win over Liberty. The Seawolves won the game 36–33 to share the 2009 Big South Championship with the Flames.

Liberty again became conference co-champions again in 2010. Coastal beat Liberty for the first time since 2006 then the Flames bounced back the next week to secure a win over Stony Brook and a share of the conference championship (three-way tie with Coastal Carolina and Stony Brook).

After the 2011 season, Rocco left Liberty for the head coaching job at Richmond.

Turner Gill era (2012–2018) 
Liberty became the conference co-champion for the third time in 2012. After starting off 2–0 in conference play, Liberty traveled to Coastal Carolina, where they lost to the Chanticleers 36–12, bringing their overall record to 3–5.  Liberty would then play then ninth ranked Stony Brook, beating them 28–14, also extending their at home conference win streak which dates back to 2006.  In order to win a share at the Big South title, they would have to beat the Virginia Military Institute Keydets.  Liberty won the game 33–14, and won a share of the title along with Stony Brook and Coastal Carolina with a record of 6–5 (5–1 in conference play).

The 2013 Flames shared the conference championship for a second consecutive year in 2013. Liberty opened up conference play at home against Coastal Carolina, where they let a 19-point lead slip away in the second half as the Chanticleers rallied to win in double overtime, 55–52. The Flames would rebound with a shutout victory at Gardner-Webb to mark the first shutout in Turner Gill's eight seasons as a head coach. After victories at home over VMI and Presbyterian, the Flames captured a share of the Big South title with a 56–14 victory at Charleston Southern who has previously beaten Coastal Carolina. Liberty shared the title with Coastal Carolina, each with identical 4–1 conference marks, though Coastal Carolina received the automatic bid to the FCS playoffs.

Liberty became the conference co-champion for the third consecutive year in 2014. Liberty started Big South Conference play against Gardner-Webb with a 34–0 shutout victory. After three consecutive conference victories, the Flames fell at home to Charleston Southern, 38–36. The loss to Charleston Southern would be Liberty's only loss in Big South play. The Flames rebounded with a 15–14 win over rival Coastal Carolina (ranked No. 1 in the FCS polls at the time), and Liberty clinched a share of the Big South Conference championship. Liberty also earned its first ever FCS playoff berth in school history. Liberty defeated James Madison in the first round of the playoffs, 26–21, before losing to Villanova in the second round, 29–22.

Liberty earned a conference co-championship again in 2016, marking their eighth conference championship. They finished the season 6–5, 4–1 in Big South play to share the conference championship with Charleston Southern. Despite the conference title, the Flames were not invited to the FCS playoffs.

Citing the need to care for his wife, Gill announced his retirement from coaching after the 2018 season.

Hugh Freeze era (2019–2022) 
Seventeen months after resigning from Ole Miss Rebels football, Hugh Freeze was named as Liberty's ninth head coach on December 7, 2018. For the 2019 season, the Liberty Flames would finish 8–5. They would make and win their first bowl game as an FBS program. In 2020, after a 6–0 start, Liberty made it in the AP Top 25 Poll for the first time in their program history, making it at No. 25. Liberty would go on to finish 10–1 in 2020 and finish the season ranked 17th in the AP Top 25 Poll. Freeze departed Liberty on November 28, 2022, to be the head coach at Auburn University after a few weeks of negotiations, discussions, and rumors.

Conference affiliations
Liberty has been both independent and affiliated with one conference.
 NAIA Independent (1973–1980)
 Division II Independent (1981–1987)
 Division I-AA Independent (1988–2001)
 Big South Conference (2002–2017)
 FBS Independent (2018–2022)
Conference USA (2023–future)

Conference championships
Liberty has won eight Big South Conference championships, two outright and six shared.

† Co-championship

Bowl games
Liberty has participated in four bowl games, since joining the FBS in 2018, going 3–1.

Playoff appearances
Liberty has made one appearance in the I-AA/FCS playoffs since 1989, going 1–1.

Head coaches
Liberty has had ten head coaches in program history, not including interim coaches.

Facilities
Liberty plays its home games at Williams Stadium which has a capacity of 25,000.

Notable former players
 Walt Aikens (CB), 4th round pick in the 2014 NFL Draft for the Miami Dolphins. 
 Mike Brown (WR), Liberty University Running Backs Coach.
 Dwayne Carswell (TE), former professional football player for the Denver Broncos.
 Samkon Gado (RB), former professional football player for the Green Bay Packers, Houston Texans, Miami Dolphins and St. Louis Rams.
 Antonio Gandy-Golden (WR), 4th round pick in the 2020 NFL Draft for the Washington Football Team.
 Eric Green (TE), former professional football player for the Pittsburgh Steelers, Miami Dolphins, Baltimore Ravens and New York Jets.
 Wayne Haddix (CB), former professional football player for the New York Giants, Tampa Bay Buccaneers and Cincinnati Bengals.
 Rashad Jennings (RB), former professional football player for the Jacksonville Jaguars, Oakland Raiders and New York Giants
 James McKnight (WR), former professional football player for the Seattle Seahawks, Dallas Cowboys and Miami Dolphins.
 Malik Willis (QB), 3rd Round selection for the Tennessee Titans in the 2022 NFL Draft

Future opponents
Future non-conference opponents announced as of September 16, 2022. Most of the games schedule from 2024 to 2026 were scheduled before the program announced joining Conference USA, which will take place in 2023. As a result, some games in those three seasons will be canceled to accommodate the new conference schedule.

References

External links

 

 
American football teams established in 1973
1973 establishments in Virginia